Jam is a type of fruit preserve.

Jam or Jammed may also refer to:

Other common meanings 
 A firearm malfunction
 Block signals
 Radio jamming
 Radar jamming and deception
 Mobile phone jammer
 Echolocation jamming

Arts and entertainment

Music 
 The Jam, an English band, late 1970s-early 1980s
 The Jam (production team)
 JAM Project, a Japanese animation music group
 Judy and Mary, a Japanese band
 Jam (album), by Little Angels
 "Jam" (Michael Jackson song)
 "Jam" (The Yellow Monkey song)
 "Jam (Turn It Up)", a song by Kim Kardashian
 Jam, improvise music in a jam session
 Jammed (album), a 2004 studio album by The Church

Other 
 Jam (film), a 2006 film by Craig E. Serling
 Jam (novel), a 2010 novel by Ben "Yahtzee" Croshaw
 Jam (TV series), UK
 Jam Kuradoberi, a character in the Guilty Gear game series
 The Jam (comics), by Bernie Mireault
 HBO Kids, formerly known as "Jam" from 2001 until 2016

Codes 
 Jamaica (ISO country code: JAM)
 Jamaican Patois (SO 639-3: jam), an English-based creole language

Computing 
 JAM (disk compression), DOS disk compression software by JAM Software
 JAM Message Base Format
 Perforce Jam, a software building tool
 .jam, a file type for JAM/STAPL, a Standard Test and Programming Language

Media 
 BBC Jam, an online educational service
 Jam!, a Canadian entertainment news site
 Jam 88.3, branding of DWJM, a radio station in Metro Manila
 Jam 96.3, branding of WJAM, a radio station in Selma, Alabama
 JamRadio, the student radio station of the University of Hull, England

Organisations 
 JAM (trade union), a manufacturing trade union in Japan
 JAM Creative Productions, a jingle company in Texas, US
 JAM Productions (company), a short-lived computer game development company
 Naughty Dog, formerly JAM Software Inc., first-party video game developer in California US
 Jamaat al Muslimeen, an Islamist terrorist organization in Trinidad and Tobago
 Jaish al Mahdi or Mahdi Army, an Iraqi military force created by Muqtada al-Sadr

People 
 Jam (title), various rulers in India and Pakistan
 Jam Handy (1886–1983), American swimmer and film producer

Places

Iran 
 Jam County, Bushehr Province
 Jam, Iran, a city
 Jam Rural District
 Jam, Khuzestan, a village
 Jam, Semnan, a village

Elsewhere 
 Jamrud or Jam, Khyber Agency, Pakistan
 Jám or Iam, Berlişte Commune, Caraş-Severin County, Romania
 Jam River, Madhya Pradesh, India
 Jam Dam
 Minaret of Jam, Afghanistan

Sports 
 Jam, a round in a roller derby game
 Long Beach Jam (2003–2005) and Bakersfield Jam (2006–2016), later Northern Arizona Suns, a basketball team

Other uses 
 Jam., an abbreviation for the Epistle of James
 Jam or Jamshid, a mythological figure of Greater Iranian culture and tradition
 JAM Liner, a bus company in the Philippines
 Joint Admission Test for M.Sc., an Indian admission test
 Junctional adhesion molecule, a protein that in humans is encoded by the JAM2 gene
 Jut Art Museum, a museum in Taipei, Taiwan
 Time in Jamaica, shortened to JAM, official time of Jamaica, UTC−5

See also 
 Traffic jam or traffic congestion
 Log jam
 Jams (disambiguation)
 Jamming (disambiguation)
 Jamb (disambiguation)